Zawyet Umm El Rakham ( lit. "the resthouse of the mother of vultures") is an archaeological site located on the North coast of Egypt 20 km to the west of Marsa Matruh, and about 300 km to the west of Alexandria

During the reign of Ramesses II, it was the location of a major fortress-town which probably marked the western extent of direct Egyptian influence.

It was discovered in 1948 and in the subsequent years was sporadically examined by Alan Rowe and Labib Habachi. Since 1994 extensive excavations have been undertaken at the site by a team from the University of Liverpool under the direction of Steven Snape.

References

Further reading
S. Snape & P. Wilson Zawiyet Umm el-Rakham I: The Temple and Chapels (Rutherford Press, Bolton: 2007)
L. Habachi: The Military Posts of Ramesses II on the Coastal Road and the Western Part of the Delta, in: BIFAO 80 (1980), S. 13-30
S. R. Snape: Walls, Wells and Wandering Merchants: Egyptian Control of the Marmarica in the Late Bronze Age in: C.J. Eyre (Hrsg.), Proceedings of the Seventh International Congress of Egyptologists, Leuven 1998, S. 1081-84 
S. R. Snape: The excavations of the Liverpool University Mission to Zawiyet Umm el-Rakham 1994-2001, in: ASAE 78 (2004), S. 149–160, Kairo.

Archaeological sites in Egypt